The following lists events that happened during 1803 in Chile.

Incumbents
Royal Governor of Chile: Luis Muñoz de Guzmán

Events

March
March 3-5: The Parliament of Negrete convenes. It is considered the last great parliament of the colonial period in Chile.

References

 
Years of the 19th century in Chile
Years in the Captaincy General of Chile
1800s in the Captaincy General of Chile
Chile
Chile